Ivan Yakovych Chornousov, also known as Chorny Voron ("Black Raven"), was a participant in the Russian Civil War on the territories of what is now Kyiv and Poltava in modern Ukraine. He is known for his fight against communists  that he believed supported or took part in the establishment of the power of the Soviet government on the territories of the emerging Ukrainian Republic in 1917–23. While some consider him to be a national hero, others consider him to simply be a bandit and murderer. He is a prominent example of the "village otamans" or "greens", local militia leaders, who were characteristic of the time.

References

Sources 
 http://2000.net.ua/2000/svoboda-slova/rezonans/72245
 http://ukrlife.org/main/evshan/reness3.htm
 http://ukrlife.org/main/evshan/zapovit8.htm
 http://www.nezboryma-naciya.org.ua/show.php?id=202
 https://web.archive.org/web/20100903111354/http://www.ukrnationalism.org.ua/publications/?n=927
 http://www.kavkazweb.net/forum/viewtopic.php?t=34797&sid=f2e93cfd11004db4ad9460dfbfd96f1f
 https://web.archive.org/web/20080324051549/http://disser.com.ua/contents/p-3/29049.html
 http://www.dt.ua/3000/3150/35845/
 http://www.personal-plus.net/498/9695.html

People of the Russian Civil War
20th-century Ukrainian people
Year of birth missing
Year of death missing